Payari is a village in Bangladesh. It is situated in Satrujitpur Union, Magura Sadar Upazila, Magura District of the Khulna Division. The Nabaganga River flows nearby.

See also
 List of villages in Bangladesh

References 

Villages in Magura District
Villages in Khulna Division
Populated places in Khulna Division